In Buddhist studies, particularly East Asian Buddhist studies, post-canonical Buddhist texts, Buddhist apocrypha or Spurious Sutras and Sastras designate texts that are not accepted as canonical by some historical Buddhist schools or communities who referred to a canon. The term is principally applied to texts that purport to represent Buddhist teaching translated from Indian texts, but were written in East Asia.

Examples 
 Innumerable Meanings Sutra
 Sutra of the Original Acts which Adorn the Bodhisattvas (菩薩本業瓔珞經, P'u-sa ying-lo pen-yeh ching)
 Sutra of Adamantine Absorption (金剛三昧經, Kŭmgang sammaegyŏng)
 Sutra on the Conversion of the Barbarians (老子化胡經,  Lao-tzu Hua-hu ching)

See also 
 Atthakatha
 Chinese Buddhist canon
 Early Buddhist Texts
 Mahayana Canon
 Pāli Canon
 Tripitaka

Citations

Sources

Bibliography 
 Arai, K.; Bando, S.; Cleary, J.C.; Gregory, P.N.; Shih, H. (2005). Apocryphal Scriptures, Berkeley, Numata Center for Buddhist Translation and Research, . (Translations of the Bequeathed Teaching Sutra, the Ullambana Sutra, the Sutra of Forty-two Sections, The Sutra of Perfect Enlightenment, and the Sutra on the Profundity of Filial Love)
 Buswell, Robert E.; ed. (1990). Chinese Buddhist Apocrypha, Honolulu: University of Hawaii Press, 
 Buswell, Robert E.; ed. (2003). Encyclopedia of Buddhism, New York: Macmillan Reference Lib. 
 Epstein, Ron (1976). The Shurangama-Sutra (T. 945): A Reappraisal of its Authenticity, presented at the annual meeting of the American Oriental Society, March 16–18, 1976, Philadelphia, Pennsylvania
Harada Waso 原田和宗 (2010). 「般若心経」の成立史論　(title tr into English - History of the Establishment of Prajñaparamitahrdayasūtram). 東京: Daizo-shuppan 大蔵出版.  (in Japanese)
Harada Waso (2010), An Annotated Translation of The Prajñaparamitahrdaya, Association of Esoteric Buddhist Studies, Vol.2002, No.209, pp. L17-L62 (in Japanese)  
Harada Waso (2017) 'A Partial English Summary of Harada Waso's works on The Heart Sūtra -- courtesy of Pat457'
Karashima Seishi (2013). "The Meaning of 'Yulanpen 盂蘭盆' - 'Rice Bowl' on Pravāraṇā Day, Annual Report of The International Research Institute for Advance Buddhology at Soka University for the Academic Year 2012, Volume XVI, March 2013, pp 289-304. 
Li Xuezhu 李学竹 (2010). 中国梵文贝叶概况. (title tr to English: The State of Sanskrit Language Palm Leaf Manuscripts in China). 中国藏学 (journal title tr to English: China Tibetan Studies), pp 55-56 百度文库(in Chinese)
 Mizuno, Kogen (1982). Buddhist Sūtras: Origin, Development, Transmission. Tokyo: Kosei Publishing,
 Mochizuki, Shinko, Pruden, Leo M.; trans.; Pure Land Buddhism in China: A Doctrinal History, The Translation of Texts-Spurious Scriptures. In: Pacific World Journal, Third Series Number 3, Fall 2001, pp. 271-275
 Nadeau, Randall L. (1987). The "Decline of the Dharma" in Early Chinese Buddhism, Asian Review volume 1 (transl. of the "Scripture Preached by the Buddha on the Total Extinction of the Dharma")
 Nattier, Jan (1992).  'The Heart Sūtra: A Chinese Apocryphal Text?',  Journal of the International Association of Buddhist Studies Vol. 15 (2), pp. 153-223
 Swanson, Paul (1998). Apocryphal Texts in Chinese Buddhism. T'ien-t'ai Chih-i's Use of Apocryphal Scriptures: In: Arie Van Debeek, Karel Van Der Toorn (eds.), Canonization and Decanonization, Leiden; Boston: Brill, 
 Skilling, Peter (2010).  'Scriptural Authenticity and the Śrāvaka Schools: An Essay towards an Indian Perspective, The Eastern Buddhist Vol. 41. No. 2, 1-48'
 Yamabe, Nobuyoshi (2002). 'Practice of Visualization and the Visualization Sutra : An Examination of Mural Paintings at Toyok, Turfan, Pacific World Third Series No. 4 Fall 2002, pp 123-152.
 Yang, Weizhong (2016). 《仁王般若经》的汉译及其“疑伪”之争 (title tr. to English: The Chinese Translation of "The Humane King Perfection of Wisdom Sutra" and Arguments Regarding its Suspicious or Apocryphal [Origins] 西南大学学报-人文社会科学版 (trans to English : Journal of Southwest University - Humanities and Social Science Edition), pp 81-86.  (in Chinese)
 Yang, Weizhong (2016). 《圆觉经》的真伪之争新辨(title tr. to English: The New Analysis of the Authenticity of the 'Sutra of Perfect Enlightenment') 西北大学学报-哲学社会科学版 (trans to English : Journal of Northwest University - Philosophy and Social Science Edition), pp 35-40. 《圆觉经》的真伪之争新辨 (in Chinese)

 
Buddhist studies